The Wolves of Kromer is a 1998 gay-themed, allegorical fantasy film directed by Will Gould and based on a play of the same name by Charles Lambert.

In the small English village of Kromer, the local residents are angered by the wild parties held by the promiscuous 'wolves' who dwell on the edge of town. When a woman is killed by her servants, they manage to put the blame on the wolves, who soon find themselves hunted by an angry mob. Narrated by Boy George, the allegorical tale explores the origins and effects of homophobia.

The film debuted at the San Francisco International Lesbian & Gay Film Festival in 1998 but was released in theaters in December 2000.

Cast 
Boy George as the narrator
James Layton as Gabriel
Lee Williams as Seth
Margaret Towner as Doreen
Rita Davies as Fanny
Rosemarie Dunham as Mrs Drax
Kevin Moore as the Priest
David Prescott as Mark
Angharad Rees as Mary
Matthew Dean as Kester
Leila Lloyd-Evelyn as Polly
Alastair Cumming as Michael

Crew 

 Director - Will Gould
 Producer - Charles Lambert
 Screenplay adapted by Charles Lambert and Matthew Read
 Music composed and conducted by Basil Moore-Asfouri
 Line producer - Clare Erasmus
 Director of Photography - Laura Remacha
 Editor - Carol Salter
 Screen designer - Mark Larkin
 Costume designer - Shanti Freed
 Hair and make up - Caroline Rose
 Co-editors - Sotira Kyriacou & Conal Percy
 Production manager - Emma Hancox
 1st assistant director - Greg Cole
 2nd assistant director - Debbie Malynn
 Production co-ordinator - Caroline Luguet
 Focus pullers - Iwan reynolds, Douglas Gray & Martin Gooch
 Clapper loader - Clair Parkinson
 Dubbing mixer - Peter Hodges Amps
 Adr/foley mixer - Chris Trussler Amps
 Sound Editors - Peter Hodges Amps and Susan Lenny
 Foley artist - Peter Burgis
 Property Master - Edwin Lambert
 Special effects / prosthetics - Jonathan Joslin
 Pyrotechnic special effects supervisor - Steven Miller
 Costume assistant and supervisor - Elena d'Cruze
 Costume consultant - Nadine Hindi
 Hair and make-up artist - Sophie Oliver
 Art department assistant - Llewelyn Hancox
 Gaffer - Rasmus Bleekemolen
 Sparks - Paul Ullah, Tim Bonnebaight & Andy Munday
 Key grip - Simon Middleton
 Grip assistant - Ben Jackson

External links
 
 
 

1998 films
British LGBT-related films
1998 LGBT-related films
1990s English-language films
1990s British films